Tun is a locality situated in Lidköping Municipality, Västra Götaland County, Sweden. It had 206 inhabitants in 2010.

References 

Populated places in Västra Götaland County
Populated places in Lidköping Municipality